Environmental issues in Iran include, especially in urban areas, vehicle emissions, refinery operations, and industrial effluents which contribute to poor air quality. A report by the United Nations Environment Programme ranked Iran at 117th place among 133 countries in terms of environmental indexes. Water scarcity is a serious issue, and the country is also threatened by climate change.

Air pollution 
The World Bank estimates losses inflicted on Iran's economy as a result of deaths caused by air pollution at $640 million, which is equal to 5.1 trillion rials or 0.57 percent of GDP. Diseases resulting from air pollution are inflicting losses estimated at $260 million per year or 2.1 trillion rials or 0.23 percent of the GDP on Iran's economy. 

Most cars use leaded gasoline and lack emissions control equipment. Tehran is rated as one of the world's most polluted cities. However, buses and cars running on natural gas are planned to replace the existing public transportation fleet in the future. Also, energy prices are kept artificially low in Iran through heavy state subsidies, resulting in highly inefficient and polluting consumption patterns. Traffic management, vehicle inspection, general use of electric bicycles and electronic government are also part of the solution.

A rising incidence of respiratory illnesses prompted the city governments of Tehran and Arak, southwest of the capital, to institute air pollution control programs. These programs aim to reduce gradually the amount of harmful chemicals released into the atmosphere.

Climate change 

Iran is party to the Kyoto Protocol on climate change but not its Doha Amendment. It has signed but not ratified the Paris Agreement on climate change.

Ecosystems 
Much of Iran’s territory suffers from overgrazing, desertification and or deforestation. 

Wetlands and bodies of fresh water increasingly are being destroyed as industry and agriculture expand, and oil and chemical spills have harmed aquatic life in the Persian Gulf and the Caspian Sea. Iran contends that the international rush to develop oil and gas reserves in the Caspian Sea presents that region with a new set of environmental threats. Although a Department of Environment has existed since 1971, Iran has not yet developed a policy of sustainable development because short term economic goals have taken precedence.

Signed, but not ratified: Environmental Modification, Law of the Sea, Marine Life Conservation.

Deforestation 
Iran had a 2018 Forest Landscape Integrity Index mean score of 7.67/10, ranking it 34th globally out of 172 countries.

Natural disasters 
Iran experiences periodic droughts, floods, dust storms, sandstorms and earthquakes along western border and in the northeast.

Soil erosion 
Iran ranked worst in the world for soil erosion in 2011.

Waste 
An estimated 50,000 tons of trash is produced in the country every day of which something between 70 and 80 percent is disposed of hygienically but the rest is not. Iran produces over 8 million tons of hazardous waste annually (2016).

Water 

Industrial and urban wastewater runoff has contaminated rivers, coastal and underground waters.

Water scarcity

See also

Clean Air Law of Iran
Automotive industry in Iran
Department of Environment (Iran)
Economy of Iran
Energy in Iran
Environmental issues in Tehran
Geography of Iran
International rankings of Iran
Iranian Economic Reform Plan
Natural Resources and Watershed Management Organization
Wildlife of Iran

References

External links
Department of Environment – Islamic Republic of Iran
 (2003)
US Dept. of Energy – Environment Overview for Iran
Iran: Environment and Nature
First Iranian site covering environmental news

 
Iran
Climate change in Iran